Antonovo Municipality is a municipality (obshtina) in Targovishte Province, Northeastern Bulgaria, located in the transition between the Danubian Plain and the area of the so-called Fore-Balkan. It is named after its administrative centre - the town of Antonovo.

Settlements 

(towns are shown in bold):
Population (December 2009)

 Antonovo - Antonovo - 1,453
 Bankovets - Банковец - 13
 Bogomolsko - Богомолско - 29
 Bukak - Букак - 17
 Chekantsi - Чеканци - 57
 Cherna Voda - Черна вода - 79
 Cherni Bryag - Черни бряг - 161
 Devino - Девино - 54
 Dlazhka Polyana - Длъжка поляна - 62
 Dobrotitsa - Добротица - 263
 Dolna Zlatitsa - Долна Златица - 18
 Dabravitsa - Дъбравица - 10
 Glashatay - Глашатай - 32
 Golyamo Dolyane - Голямо Доляне - 8
 Gorna Zlatitsa - Горна Златица - 38
 Halvadzhiysko - Халваджийско - 14
 Izvorovo - Изворово - 417
 Kapishte - Капище - 98
 Kitino - Китино - 95
 Konop - Коноп - 138
 Kraypole - Крайполе - 0
 Krusholak - Крушолак - 45
 Kapinets - Къпинец - 1
 Kyosevtsi - Кьосевци - 95
 Lyubichevo - Любичево - 282
 Malka Cherkovna - Малка Черковна - 6
 Malogradets - Малоградец - 101
 Manushevtsi - Манушевци - 4
 Mechovo - Мечово - 5
 Milino - Милино - 29
 Moravitsa - Моравица - 190
 Moravka - Моравка - 211
 Orach - Орач - 121
 Pirinets - Пиринец - 24
 Poroyno - Поройно - 29
 Prisoyna - Присойна - 8
 Pchelno - Пчелно - 12
 Ravno Selo - Равно село - 51
 Razdeltsi - Разделци - 254
 Svirchovo - Свирчово - 28
 Svoboditsa - Свободица - 30
 Semertsi - Семерци - 231
 Slanchovets - Слънчовец - 1
 Stara Rechka - Стара речка - 21
 Starchishte - Старчище - 102
 Stevrek - Стеврек - 415
 Stoynovo - Стойново - 38
 Stroynovtsi - Стройновци - 11
 Shishkovitsa - Шишковица - 39
 Taymishte - Таймище - 186
 Tihovets - Тиховец - 3
 Treskavets - Трескавец - 595
 Velikovtsi - Великовци - 80
 Velyovo - Вельово - 92
 Yazovets - Язовец - 10
 Yarebichno - Яребично - 6
 Yastrebino - Ястребино - 72

Demography 
The following table shows the change of the population during the last four decades.

Ethnic composition
According to the 2011 census, among those who answered the optional question on ethnic identification, the ethnic composition of the municipality was the following:

Religion
According to the latest Bulgarian census of 2011, the religious composition, among those who answered the optional question on religious identification, was the following:

See also
Provinces of Bulgaria
Municipalities of Bulgaria
List of cities and towns in Bulgaria

References

External links
 Official website 

Municipalities in Targovishte Province